Abu Tayeb Muhammad Zahirul Alam, rcds, psc, is a retired lieutenant general of Bangladesh Army. He served as Force Commander of the United Nations Mission in Liberia (UNMIL). He was the first officer in Bangladesh army to achieve such high post in the UN Peacekeeping Mission.Previously he was the commandant of the National Defence College, Bangladesh. He is serving as a chairman of Hamdard Public College's governing body.

Personal life and education 
He was born in 1952 in Boalkhali, Bangladesh. He is married and has two children.

Alam obtained his master's degree in War Studies from King's College London in 1993 where he was a Chevening Scholar, and has studied at the Royal College of Defence Studies in the United Kingdom.

Career

In Army 
He joined the army in 1975 and has served in various capacities. From 1998 to 2000, he was Director of Military Training at the Army headquarters. During 2001–2003, he served as Division Commander. Prior to his appointment as Force Commander of UNMIL (UNMIL), he was serving as Commandant of the National Defence College, from 04 Jan 2004 to 12 Jun 2008. He supposed to join Australian High commission as an ambassador but later lieutenant general Masud Uddin Chowdhury joined instead. Then, he got the prestigious appointment as force Commander at Liberia.

UN mission 
From 1994 to 1996, he commanded a mechanized infantry battalion within the United Nations Iraq-Kuwait Observer Mission (UNIKOM). He was appointed as Force commander of UNMIL by United Nations Secretary-General Ban Ki-moon in October 2008.

Post retirement 
After retirement Zahirul joined as president of seven member executive committee of Chevening Society of Bangladesh. He served as Chairman of Audit Committee of United Commercial Bank. He was chef de mission of Bangladesh contingent for Rio Olympics.

References

External links 
UN Biography, Lieutenant General A.T.M. Zahirul Alam

1952 births
Living people
Alumni of King's College London
Bangladesh Army generals
Chevening Scholars